Pedinomonadaceae is a family of green algae. They are small (less than 3 μm) single-celled algae.  Each cell has a single flagellum. Molecular data has provided evidence for an independent class Pedinophyceae (including the Pedinomonadaceae), sister to all phycoplast-containing core Chlorophyta (Chlorodendrophyceae, Trebouxiophyceae, Ulvophyceae and Chlorophyceae).

References

External links

Green algae families
Pedinophyceae